On 7 June 2017, a Shaanxi Y-8 aircraft of the Myanmar Air Force crashed on a flight from Myeik to Yangon, killing all 122 people on board. Debris from the aircraft was found in the Andaman Sea, 118 nautical miles (218 km) off Dawei by Myanmar Navy ships. It is the deadliest aviation accident in Myanmar's history.

Aircraft 
The  aircraft involved was a Shaanxi Y-8F-200 of the Myanmar Air Force, serial number 5820. It had been delivered in March 2016 and had flown for over 800 hours at the time of the crash.

Passengers and crew

Crew 
The aircraft's captain was Lt-Col Nyein Chan and the co-pilots were Lt-Col Soe Thu Win and Maj Thant Zin Htay. The aircraft had 14 crew members.

Passengers 
108 military staff members and their families, including 15 children, were on board when the plane lost communication with Dawei airbase. Six officers and 29 other military personnel were on board.

Disappearance 

The aircraft had departed from Myeik for Yangon at 13:06 local time (06:36 UTC). A search and rescue operation was launched in the Andaman Sea. An unidentified spokesman said that weather was not thought to be a factor in the aircraft's disappearance. No mayday call had been received from the aircraft.

Search 
Nine Myanmar Navy ships, and three military aircraft and helicopters were sent to assist in the search. On 8 June, it was reported that 29 bodies had been found.

The wreckage was scattered over a wide area, indicating that the aircraft might have disintegrated in flight at altitude. Storms in the area hindered the search. By 9 June, hopes of finding survivors were fading. It was later reported that there were no survivors. Instead, bodies and debris have been found scattered in the Andaman Sea, and some washed ashore.

This was the deadliest aviation accident to occur in Myanmar, surpassing the crash of a Fokker F27 Friendship 500 in 1987, which killed 49 people.

On 15 June, a fishing boat helping with the search found the tail of the aircraft off Myinkhwar Aww Bay. The cockpit voice recorder and flight data recorder were recovered on 18 June.

References 

Airliner accidents and incidents caused by ice
2017 in Myanmar
Aviation accidents and incidents in 2017
Aviation accidents and incidents in Myanmar
June 2017 events in Asia
Military history of Myanmar
2017 disasters in Myanmar